Karl Harbacher (1879–1943) was an Austrian actor.

Selected filmography

 Miss Piccolo (1914)
 No Sin on the Alpine Pastures (1915)
 Fanny Elssler (1920)
 Das blaue Duell (1920)
 The Adventuress of Monte Carlo (1921)
 The Dance of Love and Happiness (1921)
 Peter Voss, Thief of Millions (1921)
 Circus People (1922)
 Yvette, the Fashion Princesss (1922)
 The Blonde Geisha (1923)
 Old Heidelberg (1923)
 The Woman on the Panther (1923)
 Debit and Credit (1924)
 New Year's Eve (1924)
 By Order of Pompadour (1924)
 The Venus of Montmartre (1925)
 The Old Ballroom (1925)
 The Salesgirl from the Fashion Store (1925)
 Cock of the Roost (1925)
 Oh Those Glorious Old Student Days (1925)
 Struggle for the Soil (1925)
 Golden Boy (1925)
 The Woman with That Certain Something (1925)
 Darling, Count the Cash (1926)
 The Bank Crash of Unter den Linden (1926)
 Annemarie and Her Cavalryman (1926)
 The Bohemian Dancer (1926)
 Maytime (1926)
 The Captain from Koepenick (1926)
 The Circus of Life (1926)
 Nana (1926)
 The Pink Slippers (1927)
 Benno Stehkragen (1927)
 I Stand in the Dark Midnight (1927)
 The Imaginary Baron (1927)
 The Republic of Flappers (1928)
 Cry for Help (1928)
 Mariett Dances Today (1928)
 It Attracted Three Fellows (1928)
  Artists (1928)
 The Girl with the Whip (1929)
 Lux, King of Criminals (1929)
 Big City Children (1929)
 I Lost My Heart on a Bus (1929)
 What's Wrong with Nanette? (1929)
 My Heart is a Jazz Band (1929)
  Yes, Yes, Women Are My Weakness (1929)
 What a Woman Dreams of in Springtime (1929)
 Distinguishing Features (1929)
 Retreat on the Rhine (1930)
 Rag Ball (1930)
 The Cabinet of Doctor Larifari (1930)
 Kohlhiesel's Daughters (1930)
 Without Meyer, No Celebration is Complete (1931)
 Every Woman Has Something (1931)
 Berlin-Alexanderplatz (1931)
  Terror of the Garrison (1931)
 The Night Without Pause (1931)
 The Emperor's Sweetheart (1931)
 Everyone Asks for Erika (1931)
 Spione im Savoy-Hotel (1932)
 The Roberts Case (1933)
 A Woman With Power of Attorney (1934)
 Paganini (1934)
 Bashful Felix (1934)
 All Because of the Dog (1935)
 The Valiant Navigator (1935)
 Don't Lose Heart, Suzanne! (1935)
 Boccaccio (1936)
 Such Great Foolishness (1937)
 Seven Slaps (1937)
 Woman's Love—Woman's Suffering (1937)
  Men Are That Way (1939)
  Her First Experience (1939)
 The Scoundrel (1939)
 The Golden City (1942)
 The Eternal Tone (1943)

Bibliography
 Bach, Steven. Marlene Dietrich: Life and Legend. University of Minnesota Press, 2011.
 Eisner, Lotte H. The Haunted Screen: Expressionism in the German Cinema and the Influence of Max Reinhardt. University of California Press, 2008.

External links

1879 births
1943 deaths
Austrian male film actors
Actors from Klagenfurt
20th-century Austrian male actors